A Pound of Flesh for 50p, also known as Melting House, was a temporary outdoor sculpture by artist Alex Chinneck, located in London, United Kingdom. Part of the city's Merge Festival, the two-story house sculpture was constructed from 8,000 paraffin wax bricks and it was designed to melt with assistance from a heating apparatus over the course of the installation. It was displayed from September 26 to November 18, 2014, at 40 Southwark Street, SE1 9HP, the structure's roof being gradually lowered as the wax melted. After it had been reduced to "a pile of hardened goo", the sculpture was removed.

See also
 2014 in art

References

External links
 A Pound of Flesh for 50p (The Melting House), 40 Southwark Street – exhibition review by Robert Bevan (28 October 2014), London Evening Standard

2014 disestablishments in England
2014 establishments in England
2014 sculptures
Destroyed sculptures
Outdoor sculptures in London
Wax sculptures